The blue-spotted tree frog (Leptomantis cyanopunctatus) is a species of frog in the family Rhacophoridae.
It is found in Indonesia, Malaysia, Singapore, Thailand, and Vietnam, and possibly Brunei and Myanmar. Its natural habitats are subtropical or tropical moist lowland forests, subtropical or tropical moist montane forests, and rivers. It is threatened by habitat loss.

References

External links 
 Reptiles and Amphibian of Peninsular Malaysia -  Rhacophorus cyanopunctatus 

Leptomantis
Taxonomy articles created by Polbot
Amphibians described in 1998
Taxobox binomials not recognized by IUCN